Magnolia thailandica is a plant species in the Kmeria section of the genus Magnolia found in Thailand.

(+)-Syringaresinol, a lignan, can be found in M. thailandica.

References

External links

thailandica